The Vishwa Vidyalaya metro station is located on the Yellow Line of the Delhi Metro, which services the University of Delhi North campus area and the Delhi University Stadium.
It is also the alternate northern terminus for the yellow line along with Kashmere Gate. It is connected to the at-grade Khyber Pass Depot.

Station layout

Connections
Delhi Transport Corporation bus routes number 7, 26, 101, 101B, 103, 104, 105, 108, 108STL, 112, 114ST, 120, 120A, 120B, 135, 140, 143, 162, 169, 171, 173, 185, 185LSTL, 191, 192, 193, 234, 234CL, 234CLE, 235, 259, 333, 341, 402, 402CL, 813, 813CL, 883, 883A, 901, 901CL, 921, 921CL, 971, 971A, 982, TMS(+) and TMS+ Punjabi Bagh serves the station.

See also
List of Delhi Metro stations
Transport in Delhi
Delhi Metro Rail Corporation
Delhi Suburban Railway
Delhi Transport Corporation
North Delhi
National Capital Region (India)
List of rapid transit systems
List of metro systems

References

External links

 Delhi Metro Rail Corporation Ltd. (Official site) 
 Delhi Metro Annual Reports
 
 UrbanRail.Net – descriptions of all metro systems in the world, each with a schematic map showing all stations.

Delhi Metro stations
Railway stations opened in 2004
Railway stations in North Delhi district
2004 establishments in Delhi